Gender-biased diagnosing is the idea that medical and psychological diagnosis are influenced by the gender of the patient. Several studies have found evidence of differential diagnosis for patients with similar ailments but of different sexes. Female patients face discrimination through the denial of treatment or miss-classification of diagnosis as a result of not being taken seriously due to stereotypes and gender bias. According to traditional medical studies, most of these medical studies were done on men thus overlooking many issues that were related to women's health. This topic alone sparked controversy and brought about question to the medical standard of our time. Popular media has illuminated the issue of gender bias in recent years. Research that was done on diseases that affected women more were less funded than those diseases that affected men and women equally.

History 
The earliest traces of gender-biased diagnosing could be found within the disproportionate diagnosis of women with hysteria as early as 4000 years ago. Hysteria was earlier defined as excessive emotions; adapted from the Greek term, "Hystera", meaning "wandering uterus". These terms stemmed from mind-body associations regarding the uterus affecting women's overall health, especially emotionally and mentally.  Within a medical setting, this hysteria translated to the over exaggeration of symptoms and ailments. Because traditional gender roles usually place women at a subordinate position compared to men, the medical industry has historically been dominated by men. This has caused for a misdiagnosis within females due to the large number male workers in the industry holding on to beliefs regarding gender stereotypes. These gender roles and gender biases may have also contributed to why pain associated with experiences unique to women, like childbirth and menstruation, were dismissed or mistreated.

Women's overall health has long been associated with their reproductive abilities; further compounded by traditional views of sex, female gender roles, and femininity. Emotional and mental health were correlated with reproductive functions; menstruation, fertility, labour; as well as societal expectations such as desire for children, motherhood, subservience, and femininity. More specifically, if a woman did not meet the expectations of reproductive functions (such as inconsistent menstruation cycles, inability to conceive or carry to term, as well as display negative reactions such as nausea, pain), it was assumed  that she held resentment or non-desire to bear and raise children, as well as being defiant of her feminine nature and role. Conversely, if a woman were not to behave in alignment with femininity and gender role expectations, unable to maintain and care for family and housework, insubordinate, sick or in pain; then it were to mean they were mentally ill or disturbed, often diagnosed with hysteria.
In 1948 some women volunteered to take part in an experiment designed to quantify pain in laboring women. During their labor, their hands were burned in order to try to measure their pain threshold with the option to quit at any time and to receive treatment. During childbirth and as it kept progressing, the females were unable to feel an increase in pain insomuch as many of them received second degree burns without realizing.

In a 1979 observational study, 104 women and men gave responses to their health in 5 areas: "back pain, headaches, dizziness, chest pain, and fatigue". When receiving these complaints, it was seen that doctors gave extensive checkups to men more often than women with similar complaints, supporting that female patients tend to be taken less seriously than their male counterparts with regard to receiving medical illnesses.

In 1990, the National Institutes of Health recognized the disparities in research of disease in men and women. At this time, the Office of Research on Women's Health was created, primarily to raise awareness of how sex affects disease and treatments. In 1991 and 1992, recognition that a "glass ceiling" existed showcased that it was preventing female clinicians from being promoted. In 1994, the FDA created an Office of Women's Health by congressional mandate.

The Women's Health Equity Act, passed in 1993, gave women the chance to participate in medical studies and examine the gender differences. Before the act was introduced, there had been no research done on infertility, breast cancer, and ovarian cancer, which are conditions prevalent to women's health.

Clinical trials and research 
The approach to women shifted from paternalistic protection to access in the early 1980s as AIDS activists like ACT UP and women's groups challenged ways that drugs were developed. The NIH responded with policy changes in 1986, but a Government Accountability Office report in 1990 found that women were still being excluded from clinical research. That report, the appointment of Bernadine Healy as the first woman to lead the NIH, and the realization that important clinical trials had excluded women led to the creation of the Women's Health Initiative at the NIH and to the federal legislation, the 1993 National Institutes of Health Revitalization Act, which mandated that women and minorities be included in NIH-funded research.  The initial large studies on the use of low-dose aspirin to prevent heart attacks that were published in the 1970s and 1980s are often cited as examples of clinical trials that included only men, but from which people drew general conclusions that did not hold true for women.  In 1993 the FDA reversed its 1977 guidance, and included in the new guidance a statement that the former restriction was "rigid and paternalistic, leaving virtually no room for the exercise of judgment by responsible research subjects, physician investigators, and investigational review boards (IRBs)".

The National Academy of Medicine published a report called "Women and Health Research: Ethical and Legal Issues of Including Women in Clinical Studies" in 1994 and another report in 2001 called "Exploring the Biological Contributions to Human Health: Does Sex Matter?" which each urged including women in clinical trials and running analyses on subpopulations by sex.

Although guidelines have been introduced, sex bias remains an issue. A 2001 meta-analysis found that of 120 trials published in the New England Journal of Medicine, on average just 24.6% of participants enrolled were women. In addition, the same 2001 meta-analysis found that 14% of the trials included sex specific data analysis

A 2005 review by the International Council for Harmonisation of Technical Requirements for Pharmaceuticals for Human Use found that regulation in the US, Europe, and Japan required that clinical trials should reflect the population to whom an intervention will be given, and found that clinical trials that had been submitted to agencies were generally complying with those regulations.

A review of NIH-funded studies (not necessarily submitted to regulatory agencies) published between 1995 and 2010 found that they had an "average enrollment of 37% (±6% standard deviation [SD]) women, at an increasing rate over the years. Only 28% of the publications either made some reference to sex/gender-specific results in the text or provided detailed results including sex/gender-specific estimates of effect or tests of interaction."

The FDA published a study of the 30 sets of clinical trial data submitted after 2011, and found that for all of them, information by sex was available in public documents, and that almost all of them included sub-analyses by sex.

As of 2015, recruiting women to participate in clinical trials remained a challenge.

In 2018 the US FDA released draft guidelines for inclusion of pregnant women in clinical trials.

In a 2019 meta-analysis it was reported that 36.4%  of participants in 40 trials for anti-psychotic drugs were women.

Medical diagnosis 
The possibility of gender differences in experiences of pain has led to a discrepancy in treating female patients' pain over that of male patients. The phenomenon may affect physical diagnosis. Women are more likely to be given a diagnosis of psychosomatic nature for a physical ailment than men, despite presenting with similar symptoms. Women sometimes have trouble being taken seriously by physicians when they have a medically unexplained illness, and report difficulty receiving appropriate medical care for their illnesses because doctors repeatedly diagnose their physical complaints as related to psychiatric problems or simply related to female's menstrual cycle. Clinical offices that rely on healthcare routines become less distinct due to biased medical knowledge of gender.  There is a distinct differentiation between gender and sex in the medical sense. Because gender is the societal construction of what femininity and masculinity is, whereas, sex is the biological aspect that defines the dichotomy of female and male. The way of lifestyle and the place in society are often considered when diagnosing patients.

An example of a significant condition from which an extreme gender bias and differential medical attention and treatment can be noted is that of Cardiovascular disease. Of this condition, Coronary heart disease is the most prevalent; with women more often than men reported as fatalities. Due to sex based medical prerogatives, women tend to be more concerned with their primary and secondary sex health characteristics; i.e., gynecological health and breast health especially in terms of cancer; as opposed to heart health. Furthermore, mortality rates of women have increased since 1979; whereas men's conversely have displayed a decline. This can be attributed to differential treatment, specifically; preventative measures, refined diagnostic techniques and advanced medical and surgical capabilities that are directly catered to men's health. One proposed explanation of gender bias pertaining to cardiac concerns and treatment is that men are more likely report or assume symptoms to be cardiac related than women,  i.e., stress, (in stressful situations, personal situations or as a controlled variable); however these hypothesis were found to be inconsistent. When addressing women's health in relation to cardiovascular health, sexed based differences are imperative in acknowledging in order appropriately diagnose and treat symptoms. Specific diagnostic criteria for assessing women's cardiovascular health include: evaluating for high levels of triglycerides/low levels of HDL cholesterol (after menopause), diabetes, smoking, metabolic syndrome, gestational diabetes, and pre-eclampsia.

Men and women are biologically different. They differ in the mechanical workings of their hearts and in their lung capacities, resulting in women being 20-70% more likely to develop lung cancer. The differences between men and women are also seen at the cellular level. For example, the ways immune cells convey pain signals are different in men and women. As a result of these biological differences, men and women react to certain drugs and medical treatments differently. One example is opioids. When using opioids for pain relief, women and men have different reactions. Surveys of the literature also conclude that there is a need for more clinical trials that study the gender specific response to opioids.

Although there is evidence pointing to the biological difference between men and women, historically women have been excluded from clinical trials and men have been used as the standard. This male standard has its roots in ancient Greece, where the female body was viewed as a mutilated version of the male body. However, the male bias was furthered in the United States in the 1950s and 60s after the FDA issued guidelines excluding women of childbearing potential from trials to avoid any risk to a potential fetus. Additionally, the thalidomide tragedy led the FDA to issue regulations in 1977 recommending that women should be excluded from participating in Phase I and Phase II studies in the US. Studies also excluded women for other reasons including that women were more expensive to use as test subjects because of fluctuating hormone levels. The assumption that women would have the same reaction to the treatments as men was also used to justify excluding women from clinical trials.

However, more recent studies have shown that women respond differently to a variety of common drugs than men, including sleeping pills, antihistamines, aspirin and anesthesia. As a result, many drugs may actually pose health risks to women. For example, a 2001 study conducted by the Government Accountability Office about drugs removed from the market between 1997 and 2000 showed that "Eight of the 10 prescription drugs posed greater health risks for women than for men."

Pain bias 
In recent decades, the disparity between female pain treatment and male pain treatment has been receiving more attention. Chronic pain is more prevalent in women than in men, and women report more severe, frequent, and prolonged cases of pain; however, they are less likely to receive adequate health treatment. Studies show that physicians often perceive women's complaints as emotional responses rather than physiological pain. Women are less likely to be prescribed painkillers after surgeries, according to several studies conducted in the 1980s. For example, after undergoing coronary artery bypass surgery, women received more sedatives rather than pain treatment. Studies from the 2000s showed that physicians dismissed women's pain as inexplicable because they refused to believe the complaints; some physicians even blamed the female patients for their pain.

Western cultural recognition of pain bias 
As the issue of pain bias becomes more popular, media coverage of the topic has also increased. In 2014, the National Pain Report conducted an online national survey of almost 2,600 women with a variety of chronic pain conditions. 65% felt that their pain was being given inadequate attention because they were female, and 91% believed that the health-care system discriminated against women. Nearly half of the women were told that their pain was psychological, and 75% were told they must learn to deal with the pain. In 2015, The Atlantic published an article about a woman's experience with acute abdominal pain. She had to wait almost two hours at the emergency room before receiving treatment, but she endured the pain longer than necessary due to a misdiagnosis. In the United States, women wait an average of 65 minutes before receiving an analgesic for acute abdominal pain, while men only wait 49 minutes. A 2019 article published by The Washington Post references a 2008 study that supports the statements made in 2015 The Atlantic article.

Psychological diagnosis 
There was an example of gender bias in the psychiatric field as well, Hamberg notes that, "psychiatrists would diagnose women with depression and then, eventually psychiatrists would begin to assume that women were more depressed than men due to the fact that the patients that were examined by the psychiatrists were women and they had similar symptoms. As for the men, they were diagnosed with drug or alcohol problems and they were thrown out of the study." There is a suggestion that assumptions regarding gender specific behavioral characteristics can lead to a diagnostic system which is biased. The issue of gender bias with regard to Diagnostic and Statistical Manual of Mental Disorders (DSM) personality disorder criteria has been controversial and widely debated. The fourth DSM (4th ed., text revision; DSM–IV–TR; American Psychiatric Association, 2000) makes no explicit statement regarding gender bias among the ten personality disorders (PDs), but it does state that six PDs (antisocial, narcissistic, obsessive-compulsive, paranoid, schizotypal, schizoid) are more frequently found in men. Three others (borderline, histrionic, dependent) are more frequent in women. Avoidant is equally common in men and women.

There are many ways to interpret differential prevalence rates as a function of gender. Some critics have argued that they are an artifact of gender bias. In other words, the PD criteria assume unfairly that stereotypical female characteristics are pathological. The results of this study conclude with no indication of gender-biased criteria in the borderline, histrionic, and dependent PDs. This is in contrast with what is predicted by critics of these disorders, who suggest they are biased against women. It is possible, however, that other sources of bias, including assessment and clinical bias,  are still at work in relation to these disorders. The results do show that the group means are higher in women than in men, an expected result considering the higher prevalence rate of these disorders for women.

The original purpose of the DSM–IV was to provide an accurate classification of psychopathology, not to develop a diagnostic system that will, democratically, diagnose as many men with a personality disorder as women. However, if the criteria are to serve equally as indicators of disorder for both men and women, it will be important to establish that the implications of these criteria for functional impairment are comparable for both sexes. Whereas it is plausible that there are gender-specific expressions of these disorders, DSM–IV criteria that function differently for men and women can systematically over-pathologize or under-represent mental illness in a particular gender. The present study is limited by the investigation of only four personality disorders and the lack of inclusion of additional diagnoses that have also been controversial in the gender bias debate (such as dependent and histrionic personality disorders), although it offers a clearly articulated methodology for studying this possibility. In addition, it provides an examination of a clinical sample of substantial size and uses functional assessments that cut across multiple functional domains and multiple assessment methods. Our results indicate that BPD criteria showed some evidence of differential functioning between genders on global functioning, although there is little evidence of sex bias within the diagnostic criteria for avoidant, schizotypal, or obsessive–compulsive personality disorders. Further investigation and validation across sexes for those disorders would be an important direction of future research.

Considerable evidence indicates a prominent role for trauma-related cognitions in the development and maintenance of posttraumatic stress disorder (PTSD) symptoms. The present study utilized regression analysis to examine the unique relationships between various trauma-related cognitions and PTSD symptoms after controlling for gender and measures of general affective distress in a large sample of trauma-exposed college students. In terms of trauma-related cognitions, only negative cognitions about the self were related to PTSD symptom severity. Gender and anxiety symptoms were also related to PTSD symptom severity. Theoretical implications of the results are consistent with previous studies on the relationship between PTSD and negative cognitions, the self, world, and blame subscales of the PTCI were significantly related to PTSD symptoms. The study correlations indicated that increased negative trauma-related cognitions were related to more severe PTSD symptoms. Also consistent with previous reports, correlations also indicated that gender was related to PTSD symptom severity, such that women had more severe PTSD symptoms. PTSD symptom severity was also positively related to depression, anxiety, and stress reactivity.

Distinguishing between borderline personality disorder (BPD) and post traumatic stress disorder (PTSD) is often challenging, especially when the client has experienced a trauma such as childhood sexual abuse (CSA), which is strongly linked to both disorders. Although the individual diagnostic criteria for these two disorders do not overlap substantially, patients with either of these disorders can display similar clinical pictures. Both patients with BPD and PTSD may present as aggressive toward self or others, irritable, unable to tolerate emotional extremes, dysphoric, feeling empty or dead, and highly reactive to mild stressors. Despite having similar clinical pictures, PTSD and BPD are regarded differently by many clinicians. Results from a 2009 study concluded that patient gender does not affect diagnosis. This finding is consistent with research suggesting that women are not more likely to be given the BPD diagnosis, all else being equal, though it contradicts other findings from studies that have used similar case vignettes. Nor did the data support an effect of clinician gender or age on diagnosis.

A 2012 study examined gender-specific associations between trauma cognition, alcohol cravings and alcohol-related consequences in individuals with dually diagnosed PTSD and alcohol dependence (AD). Participants had entered a treatment study for concurrent PTSD and AD; baseline information was collected from participants about PTSD-related cognition in three areas: (a) Negative Cognition About Self, (b) Negative Cognition About the World, and (c) Self-Blame. Information was also collected on two aspects of AD: alcohol cravings and consequences of AD. Gender differences were examined while controlling for PTSD severity. The results indicate that Negative Cognition About Self are significantly related to alcohol cravings in men but not women, and that interpersonal consequences of AD are significantly related to Self-Blame in women but not in men. These findings suggest that for individuals with co-morbid PTSD and AD, psycho-therapeutic interventions that focus on reducing trauma-related cognition are likely to reduce alcohol cravings in men and relational problems in women.

Female patients 
Women have been described in studies and in narratives as hysterical and neurotic, and many feel that physicians take their pain less seriously. Historically, women's health was only associated with reproductive health, and thus has often been called "bikini medicine" because the field largely focused on the anatomy covered by a bathing suit. Until recently, clinical research mainly used male subjects, male cells, and male mice, and many women were excluded from research because they were considered too weak, too variable, and in need of protection from the harms associated with medical research studies. Results from these all-male studies, including studies important in understanding how certain drugs behave in the body, were applied to female patients as well, despite biological differences in the way disease presents in females and males and that women are more likely to have adverse reactions to medication. Modern research on human subjects are made up of approximately an equal distribution of female and male subjects, but female subjects in research are largely still underrepresented in specific areas of medical research, like cardiovascular research and drug studies. Narrative from physicians include reporting that women's complaints are considered exaggerated and may be assumed to be invalid. Women have been historically considered less stable than men, and their physical ailments are often considered by physicians to be a result of emotions. Women's symptoms are often not taken seriously, and women experience high rates of misdiagnosis, unrecognized symptoms, or are assumed to be experiencing a psychosomatic disorder. There has also been a reported difference between treatment of physically attractive patients versus physically unattractive patients, a bias that exists in both male and female patients, but is more pronounced in female patients. Female patients who are considered conventionally attractive are thought to be experiencing less pain than unattractive female patients. Female patients have also been considered more demanding patients, and are considered to be a greater burden than male patients.  One observer has stated that, "different forms of female suffering are minimized, mocked, coaxed into silence." In the medical community, women are perceived as having to "prove they are as sick as male patients," what the medical community has deemed "Yentyl Syndrome." There are those that disagree with this characterization, stating that chronic pain specifically is hard to treat in all people, and that there is a greater bias against young people than against genders.

Generally, women are treated less aggressively than men for pain, and over 90% of women with chronic pain believe that they are treated differently by healthcare professionals because of their gender. Women are often referred to psychiatrists for treatment, and are more likely to be prescribed sedatives than pain medicine. This can cause complications if a psychiatric condition is diagnosed, often incorrectly, and can be especially detrimental if drugs are prescribed because antidepressants and psychiatric drugs "are absorbed differently in women and vary in effectiveness" and can have unwanted side effects. Research has indicated that women metabolize drugs differently than men. However, drug dosage is rarely broken down by sex, and this can lead to highly detrimental effects.

A specific example of how misdiagnosis effects women is the care of female heart-attacks. Women who are experiencing a heart attack are seven times more likely to be misdiagnosed and released from the hospital during the heart attack. This is often due to the fact that women generally experience different heart-attack symptoms than men, including flu-like symptoms.

Aging women 
A common health concern associated with aging women is that of Menopause. Characterized simply, menopause refers to a gradual hormonal change, typically onset between the ages of 48-52 wherein menstrual periods cease, and women are no longer able to conceive and bear children.

A 2001 research interview study examined personal experiences, where age of patients within patient-doctor interactions correlated with negative experiences relating to validity and treatment of health concerns, for menopause specifically.  This study, consisting of 61 women; with varying backgrounds concerning age, race, level of education, relationship status and income, found that often patients expressed experiencing symptoms of Menopause in their early thirties and late forties; yet were dismissed due to their age not aligning with the estimated averages.

Intersection of gender and racial bias 
Specifically, Black women and women of color are at an even greater disadvantage. Black women are twice as likely to have strokes, and their chances for survival are even lower than white women. Black women are also more likely to have adverse maternal health outcomes compared to white women. They also face greater challenges when it comes to breast cancer, and are more likely to be misdiagnosed and more likely to die. In her book, The Cancer Journals, Audre Lorde speaks about her unpleasant experiences as a Black female breast cancer patient, her troubling experiences with physicians and caretakers, and her struggle to find strength after undergoing a mastectomy. In recent years, new outlets have published numerous first and second-hand accounts about Black women and women of color experiencing adverse maternal health care and outcomes throughout the US. Pro-Publica and NPR published a story about racial disparities in maternal mortality and the birth experience of Dr. Shalon Irving, a CDC epidemiologist studying how structural inequality influences health.

Although many women still face gender bias in their experiences with the healthcare system, progress has been made toward a more equitable system. The Laura W. Bush Institute for Women's Health at Texas Tech University was founded in 2007, and has been a leader in the integration of "sex-specific instruction in medical education." The team at Texas Tech created a curriculum for medical schools to include sex-differences in medical education, and ten schools are currently using the curriculum. It is likely that bias against females patients will continue to exist in medicine, but medical schools and institutions are working toward addressing the problem, and will likely continue addressing it for a long time. Medical research is slow to move into the practice stage, so even as more research is done on bias against women and how to better treat women, it will be a long time before these effects are seen.

Avoiding gender bias 
In order to avoid gender bias in medical diagnosing, researchers should conduct all studies with both male and female subjects in their samples. Healthcare workers should not assume all men and women are the same, even if they display similar symptoms. In a study done to analyze gender bias, a physician in the research sample stated, '"I am solely a professional, neutral
and genderless"'. While a seemingly positive statement, this kind of thought process can ultimately lead to gender biasing because it fails to note the real differences between men and women that must be taken into account when diagnosing a patient. Other ways to avoid gender bias includes diagnostic checklists which help to increase accuracy, evidenced-based assessments and facilitation of informed choices.

See also 
 Implicit bias
Gender discrimination in the medical profession
 Reverse sexism
 Men in nursing
 Lateral violence
 Women in medicine
 Gender disparities in health
 Occupational sexism
 Women's health
 Female hysteria

References

Further reading 

 
 

Gender equality
Medical diagnosis
Medical error
History of medicine
Feminism and health